Cartierville is a former city amalgamated into the City of Montreal, Quebec, Canada.

Cartierville may also refer to:

 Bordeaux-Cartierville, an arrondissement of Montreal
 Ahuntsic-Cartierville, an arrondissement of Montreal
 Saint-Laurent—Cartierville, now just Saint-Laurent, a federal electoral district in Quebec
 Cartierville Airport, a defunct airport in Saint-Laurent
 Cartierville Bridge or Lachapelle Bridge, over the Rivière des Prairies